The City of South Melbourne was a local government area about  south of Melbourne, the state capital of Victoria, Australia, on the south bank of the Yarra River.

The council area was bounded by the Yarra River to the north, Fraser and Lorne Streets to the south, the Port Phillip foreshore and Pickles Street to the west, and St Kilda Road to the east.

History

South Melbourne was first incorporated as the Emerald Hill Borough on 26 May 1855, and became a town on 1 March 1872. It was proclaimed a city, and was renamed South Melbourne, on 21 September 1883.

On 18 November 1993, a small portion around Southbank and the Victorian Arts Centre was annexed to the City of Melbourne.

On 22 June 1994, the City of South Melbourne was abolished, and along with the Cities of Port Melbourne and St Kilda, was merged into the newly created City of Port Phillip.

The Council met at the South Melbourne Town Hall on Bank Street, between Fishley and Layfield Streets, South Melbourne. The hall still exists and is now used by the Australian National Academy of Music.

Wards

The City of South Melbourne was divided into four wards, each electing three councillors:
 Canterbury Ward
 Fawkner Ward
 Hobson Ward
 Queens Ward

Suburbs
 Albert Park
 Melbourne (between Queens Road and St Kilda Road)
 Middle Park
 Southbank
 South Melbourne*

* Council seat.

Population

* Estimate in the 1958 Victorian Year Book.

Gallery

References

External links
 Victorian Places - South Melbourne

South Melbourne
1855 establishments in Australia
1994 disestablishments in Australia
City of Port Phillip